Wiredset LLC is an online marketing firm. headquartered in New York City.

In 2006, Wiredset developed Trendrr (United States Patent no. 8,271,429, issued on Sept. 18, 2012), a tool for measuring trends across the web.

In February 2010, Wiredset began selling Curatorr, a platform for managing comments on Twitter.

References

External links

http://trendrr.com
http://curatorr.com

Information technology consulting firms of the United States
Companies established in 2004